The Victoria Proof of age card serves as an identity photo card for residents of Victoria, Australia, who are aged over 18 years.  It is available to drivers and non-drivers, however is suited for people who do not have a driver's licence. It displays the holder's name, address, date of birth and signature.

References

Identity documents of Australia